Passerinula is a genus of fungi in the class Dothideomycetes. The relationship of this taxon to other taxa within the class is unknown (incertae sedis).

The genus name of Passerinula is in honour of Giovanni Passerini (1816-1893), who was an Italian botanist and entomologist and also director of the Orto Botanico di Parma. 

The genus was circumscribed by Pier Andrea Saccardo in Grevillea vol.4 on page 21 in 1875.

Species
As accepted by GBIF;
 Passerinula candida 
 Passerinula dubitationum 
 Passerinula rubescens 

They also place the genus within Pleosporales Order.

See also 
 List of Dothideomycetes genera incertae sedis

References

External links 
 Passerinula at Index Fungorum

Dothideomycetes enigmatic taxa
Dothideomycetes genera